John Printz Corderman (May 14, 1942 – July 2012) was an American politician and judge. He served in the Maryland Senate from 1975 to 1978.

Early life
John Printz Corderman was born in Hagerstown, Maryland, on May 14, 1942. He attended Hagerstown public schools and Hagerstown Junior College. He graduated from the University of Maryland in 1965 with a Bachelor of Arts. He graduated from the University of Maryland School of Law with a J.D. and was admitted to the bar in Maryland in 1968.

Career
Corderman was a Democrat. Corderman was the deputy state's attorney for Washington County from 1971 to 1974. He served as a member of the Maryland Senate, representing District 2, from 1975 to 1978. He resigned in 1978 and was succeeded by Victor Cushwa.

Corderman was an associate judge of the Circuit Court in Washington County (4th judicial circuit) starting in 1977. In December 1989, a mail bomb disguised as a Christmas gift blew up in Corderman's hand. He was injured in the groin and right hand. He also had hearing loss. He retired in March 1993, citing hearing problems. In 2008, Corderman, then retired, received a letter with suspicious powder, and the culprit was convicted for five years.

Corderman served on the board of directors of YMCA from 1983 to 1989. He served on the board of directors of the Rotary Club from 1986 to 1991 and as president from 1989 to 1990.

Personal life
Corderman's son, Paul D. Corderman, also became a state politician.

Corderman died in July 2012.

References

1942 births
2012 deaths
People from Hagerstown, Maryland
University System of Maryland alumni
University of Maryland Francis King Carey School of Law alumni
Democratic Party Maryland state senators
Maryland state court judges
American terrorism victims